G22 may refer to:

Firearms 
 G22 Sniper Rifle, used by the German Armed Forces
 Glock 22, a semi-automatic pistol
 Walther G22, a semi-automatic rifle

Other uses 
 BMW 4 Series (G22), an automobile
 EMD G22 Series, an American diesel locomotive
 G22 Qingdao–Lanzhou Expressway in China
 Group of 22, an international forum addressing economic issues
 Grumman G-22 Gulfhawk II, an American aircraft
 G22, a fictional group in the video game Alpha Protocol